The 5th Massachusetts Regiment also known as the 19th Continental Regiment was raised on April 17, 1775, under Colonel Mansfield outside of Boston, Massachusetts. The regiment saw action at the Battle of Concord, Battle of Bunker Hill, New York Campaign, Battle of Trenton, Battle of Princeton. Colonel Rufus Putnam took command in January 1777 and participated in the Battle of Saratoga.This regiment was commanded by Colonel John Mansfield, of Lynn, who left the service on September 15, 1775. From then until the end of the year the regiment was commanded by Lieutenant Colonel Israel Hutchinson, of Danvers. It served in the siege of Boston, and was designated the 27th Continental Regiment in the 1776 establishment.
The regiment was furloughed on June 12, 1783, at New Windsor, New York, and disbanded on November 3, 1783.

Notable members
 Daniel Shays

Notes

External links
 Bibliography of the Continental Army in Massachusetts compiled by the United States Army Center of Military History

Military units and formations established in 1775
Military units and formations disestablished in 1783
Massachusetts regiments of the Continental Army
1775 establishments in Massachusetts